Majra Nand Karan village is located in Kaithal Tehsil of Kaithal district in Haryana, India. As per 2009 stats, Majra Nand Karan village is also a gram panchayat.

FAMOUS PERSONAliTY Late.CH: Karam Singh Khatkar (S.D.O.) Puran Khatkar(DEO), Col Bhag Singh, Advocate Rajpal khatkar, Amrit Khatkar(DDA), Hoshiyar Singh(2 times panch), Rampal Majra(MLA), Leela Ram(Longest Sarpanch), Comrade Ramsarup (CPI-M), Master Manohar Lal, Kulvinder Khatkar (DFO )Mr.Rajender Khatkar(Haryana Police).Dr. Sunil khatkar and .Raju Master is Famous Social Worker in the village.

Demographics
Most of the population of the village is Hindu and widely spoken language is Haryanvi.

Schools
 Govt. high school,Govt.primary school

Transportation
The nearby Railway stations to Majra Nand Karan village are New Kaithal Halt Railway station (NKLE) and Kaithal Railway station (KLE).

From Kaithal bus stand, bus services are also available to Delhi, Hisar, Chandigarh, Jammu and many other places. For Inter-state travel HR buses are also available from nearby town Rajound.

Yuva Samiti
Since 2016 Shaheed Bhagat Singh Yuva Sangthan Doing Excellent Work In Village.Yuva sangthan organise sanskritik Ragni program every year on 27,28 September Since 2016.All famous singer like Pale Ram,Ranbir badwasniya,Ramesh kalawadiya,vikash pasoriya,amit malik,vikash satrod,ishwar chhatter perform in Village year by year.

References 

Villages in Kaithal district